Upeneus doriae, the gilded goatfish, is a species of ray-finned fish within the family Mullidae. The species is found distributed in the western Indian Ocean in the Persian Gulf and the Gulf of Oman. It is a demersal species, schooling over sandy substrates, reef areas, and near coastal areas at depths up to 45 meters. It grows to lengths of 20 to 30 centimeters.

Conservation 
Upeneus doriae has been classified as a 'Data deficient' species by the IUCN Red List. It is often captured in fisheries, however there is no population data on the species, leading to uncertanty of the effects this may have on the species current population at a global level.

References 

IUCN Red List data deficient species
Fish described in 1869
doriae
Fish of the Persian Gulf
Taxa named by Albert Günther